Jane Gaskell (born July 7, 1941 in Lancaster, England) is a British fantasy writer. She wrote her first novel, Strange Evil, at age 14. It was published two years later and was described by John Grant as "a major work of the fantastic imagination", comparing it to George MacDonald's Lilith and David Lindsay's A Voyage to Arcturus. China Miéville lists Strange Evil as one of the top 10 examples of weird fiction whilst John Clute called it "an astonishingly imaginative piece of fantasy by any standards."<ref name=Clute>"Gaskell, Jane", The Encyclopedia of Fantasy, John Clute & John Grant, ed., p.190</ref>

Gaskell's horror novel The Shiny Narrow Grin (1964) featured a sympathetic, tormented vampire and was described by Brian Stableford as one of the first "revisionist vampire novels", whose most successful exemplar was Interview with the Vampire by Anne Rice. The Shiny Narrow Grin was also listed by horror historian Robert S. Hadji in his list of "unjustly neglected" horror novels.

Her Atlan saga is set in prehistoric South America and in the mythical world of Atlantis. The series is written from the point of view of its clumsy heroine Cija, except for the last book, which is narrated by her daughter Seka.  In 1970 she received the Somerset Maugham Award for her novel A Sweet Sweet Summer (jointly with Piers Paul Read for his Monk Dawson). A Sweet, Sweet Summer features aliens visiting a violent future Earth; Baird Searles stated the book makes "A Clockwork Orange look like Winnie the Pooh".

From the 1960s to the 1980s, Gaskell worked as a journalist on the Daily Mail. She later became a professional astrologer.

Books

Standalone novelsStrange Evil (1957)King's Daughter (1958)The Shiny Narrow Grin (1964)All Neat in Black Stockings (1968)Attic Summer (1969)A Sweet, Sweet Summer (1969)Summer Coming (1972)Sun Bubble (1990)

The Atlan SagaThe Serpent (1963)The Dragon (the second half of 'The Serpent' in later editions - 1975)Atlan (1965)The City (1966)Some Summer Lands'' (1977)

References

External links

 

1941 births
Living people
English fantasy writers
English science fiction writers
Weird fiction writers
English astrologers
20th-century astrologers
21st-century astrologers
English women novelists
20th-century English women
20th-century English people
21st-century English women
21st-century English people